Sir Donald Burns Sangster ON GCVO (26 October 1911 – 11 April 1967) was a Jamaican solicitor and politician, and the second Prime Minister of Jamaica.

Early life

Donald Burns Sangster was born in Black River in the parish of St. Elizabeth, Jamaica. His father William B. Sangster was a land surveyor and a planter. His mother's name is Cassandra Sangster (née Plummer).
Sangster attended the prestigious Munro College in St. Elizabeth.

Political career

He entered politics at the age of 21 in 1933, when he was elected to the Parish Council of St Elizabeth, Jamaica. In 1944 he was elected to the House of Representatives of Jamaica as a member of the Jamaica Labour Party (JLP). He then went on to become Minister of Social Welfare and Labour and later, Minister of Finance. He became Acting Prime Minister in February 1964 when Prime Minister Sir Alexander Bustamante became ill.

On 21 February, in the 1967 Jamaican general election, the JLP were victorious again, winning 33 out of 53 seats, with the PNP taking 20 seats.

He succeeded Bustamante as Prime Minister on 23 February 1967, and he only had one cabinet meeting before he fell ill less than two weeks later and became the only prime minister to die in office on 11 April, after suffering a subarachnoid haemorrhage.

His face appears on the Jamaican one hundred dollar banknote. Sangster International Airport in Montego Bay is named after him.

Knighthood

Sangster was taken ill on 18 March 1967, and was flown by the U.S. government to the Montreal Neurological Institute for specialist treatment. He went into a coma a few weeks later on 1 April, and was knighted by Queen Elizabeth II during that period; he died 10 days later.

References

Sources
 , The Jamaica Gleaner, 3 September 2007.

1911 births
1967 deaths
Deaths from subarachnoid hemorrhage
Finance ministers of Jamaica
Government ministers of Jamaica
Jamaica Labour Party politicians
Jamaican knights
Recipients of the Order of the Nation
Jamaican Knights Grand Cross of the Royal Victorian Order
Members of the House of Representatives of Jamaica
People from Saint Elizabeth Parish
Prime Ministers of Jamaica